The Gokcha barbel (Barbus goktschaicus) is a species of ray-finned fish in the genus Barbus. It occurs in Lake Sevan (previously known as Gokcha) and its tributaries.

References

goktschaicus
Cyprinid fish of Asia
Fish described in 1877
Taxa named by Karl Kessler